Fouad Moussa Hijazi (born 27 June 1973) is a Lebanese football manager and former player who is the assistant coach of  club Ansar.

As a player, Hijazi was midfielder and played for Lebanon in the 2000 AFC Asian Cup. He also played for Bourj, Sagesse, Irshad, and Khoyol at club level.

International career 
In 2002, Hijazi played for the Lebanon Olympic team at the 2002 Asian Games, scoring a goal in an 11–0 win against Afghanistan.

Managerial career 
On 3 November 2020, during the 2020–21 season, Hijazi was appointed head coach of Lebanese Premier League side Bourj. He won his first title on 1 August 2021, after winning the 2021 Lebanese Challenge Cup. On 26 June 2022, Hijazi was appointed assistant coach to Jamal Taha at Ansar.

Career statistics

International
Scores and results list Lebanon's goal tally first, score column indicates score after each Hijazi goal.

Honours

Player 
Sagesse
 Lebanese Second Division: 1998–99
 Lebanese Premier League runner-up: 2001–02
 Lebanese FA Cup runner-up: 2005–06
 Lebanese Federation Cup runner-up: 2004

Manager 
Bourj
 Lebanese Challenge Cup: 2021

See also
 List of Lebanon international footballers born outside Lebanon

References

External links
 
 
 

Living people
1973 births
Sportspeople from Monrovia
Lebanese people of Liberian descent
Sportspeople of Liberian descent
Lebanese footballers
Association football midfielders
Bourj FC players
Sagesse SC footballers
Al Irshad SC players
Al Khoyol FC players
Lebanese Premier League players
Lebanese Second Division players
Lebanese football managers
Association football coaches
Sagesse SC football managers
Bourj FC managers
Lebanon youth international footballers
Lebanon international footballers
Asian Games competitors for Lebanon
Footballers at the 1998 Asian Games
2000 AFC Asian Cup players
Footballers at the 2002 Asian Games